Lachnopodus is a genus of crabs in the family Xanthidae, containing the following species:

 Lachnopodus bidentatus (A. Milne-Edwards, 1867)
 Lachnopodus gibsonhilli (Tweedie, 1950)
 Lachnopodus ponapensis (Rathbun, 1907)
 Lachnopodus rodgersi Stimpson, 1858
 Lachnopodus subacutus (Stimpson, 1858)
 Lachnopodus tahitensis De Man, 1889

References

Xanthoidea